The Akademika Barabashova is a station on Kharkiv Metro's Saltivska Line. The station was opened on 11 August 1984. Station was named after Soviet Ukrainian astronomer Nikolai P. Barabashov

Kharkiv Metro stations
Railway stations opened in 1984